Thomas Chase-Casgrain,  (28 July 1852 – 29 December 1916), also known as Thomas Casgrain, was a French-Canadian lawyer and politician. As a young attorney he became famous for his participation in the prosecution of Louis Riel.

He was born at Detroit in 1852, the son of Charles Eusèbe Casgrain, and studied at the Petit Séminaire de Québec and the Université Laval. He was admitted to the Quebec Bar in 1877 and received the Dufferin Silver Medal in the same year. He was named professor of law at Université Laval two years later.

In 1885, he was named to the legal team representing the Crown in the trial of Louis Riel. Although the crown was represented by a large team including George Burbidge, Christopher Robinson, Britton Bath Osler and others, Casgrain was the only French-Canadian in the group.  Pro-Riel sentiment in the province of Quebec was so strong that he was burned in effigy during at least one demonstration.

However, this did not prevent him from being elected in the Legislative Assembly of Quebec. He was elected for Quebec County in 1886 and for Montmorency in 1892. He was attorney general in the provincial cabinet from December 1891 to November 1892 and again from December 1892 to May 1896. He represented Montmorency as a Conservative Member of Parliament in the House of Commons of Canada from 1896 to 1904 and Quebec County from 1914 until his death from pneumonia at Ottawa in 1916. He was entombed at the Notre Dame des Neiges Cemetery in Montreal. He served as Postmaster General from October 1914 until his death.

Electoral record

References 
General

 
 Biography from Assemblée nationale du Québec 
 

Inline citations

Beaubien-Casgrain family
1852 births
1916 deaths
Lawyers in Quebec
Canadian legal scholars
Members of the House of Commons of Canada from Quebec
Conservative Party of Canada (1867–1942) MPs
Members of the King's Privy Council for Canada
Postmasters General of Canada
Conservative Party of Quebec MNAs
Academics in Quebec
Université Laval alumni
Politicians from Detroit
Burials at Notre Dame des Neiges Cemetery